Fantasía o realidad is the second studio album from Álex Ubago. It was released on February 24, 2004; the album was commercially successful, being certified 3× Platinum in Spain, Platinum+Gold in Mexico, Platinum (Latin) in the United States and Gold in Argentina.

Track listing
 Aunque no te pueda ver
 Fantasía o realidad
 Dame tu aire
 Prefiero
 Cuanto antes
 Otro día más
 Allí estaré
 Despertar
 Lo más grande
 Por tantas cosas
 Salida
 No soy yo

Alternate version
Two different versions of this album were released. The original released in Spain contained two different songs than the version released in the rest of the world. The two songs are “Lo más grande” and “No soy yo”.

Sales and certifications

References

2004 albums
Álex Ubago albums